Desideri is an Italian surname. Notable people with the surname include:

 Danilo Desideri (born 1940), Italian  cinematographer 
 Ippolito Desideri (1684–1733), Italian Jesuit missionary in Tibet
 Osvaldo Desideri (born 1939), Italian art director
 Stefano Desideri (born 1965), Italian football player and coach

Italian-language surnames